James Elliot Lapine (born January 10, 1949) is an American stage director, playwright, screenwriter, and librettist. He has won the Tony Award for Best Book of a Musical three times, for Into the Woods, Falsettos, and Passion. He has frequently collaborated with Stephen Sondheim and William Finn.

Early life
Lapine was born in Mansfield, Ohio, the son of Lillian (Feld) and David Sanford Lapine. He graduated from Franklin and Marshall College in 1971. Though he did not actively pursue theatre in childhood, Lapine did play Jack in an elementary school production of Jack and the Beanstalk.

Career
Lapine did graduate study in photography and graphic design at the California Institute of the Arts, where he received an MFA in 1973. He was a photographer, graphic designer, and architectural preservationist, and taught design at the Yale School of Drama. At Yale University he wrote an adaptation of and directed Gertrude Stein's Photograph, which was produced Off-Broadway at the Open Space in SoHo in 1977. He went on to write and direct Off-Broadway plays and musicals, directing composer William Finn's March of the Falsettos in 1981; the musical won the Outer Critics Circle Award for Best Off-Broadway Play. Frank Rich, the New York Times theater critic, noted "Mr. Lapine's wildly resourceful staging".

In 1982, Lapine was introduced to Stephen Sondheim. The pair developed Sunday in the Park with George: Lapine wrote the book and directed; Sondheim created the music and lyrics. The play was first produced Off-Broadway in 1983, and moved to Broadway in 1984. Their next musical was Into the Woods, which premiered on Broadway in 1987, for which Lapine won the Tony Award and the Drama Desk Award for Best Book of a Musical. They next collaborated on the musical Passion, for which Lapine wrote the book and directed. The musical ran on Broadway in 1994 and in the West End in 1996, receiving a nomination for the Olivier Award for Best New Musical, and winning the Tony Award for Best Musical and the Tony Award for Best Book of a Musical, among other awards and nominations. Their last collaboration was the revue Sondheim on Sondheim. Presented on Broadway in 2010, it won the Drama Desk Award for Outstanding Musical Revue.

In 1992, Lapine returned to working with William Finn, and wrote the book and directed the Broadway musical Falsettos. Lapine wrote the book and  Finn composed the music for A New Brain, which premiered Off-Broadway in 1998. They later worked together on Finn's musical The 25th Annual Putnam County Spelling Bee, which premiered Off-Broadway in 2005 and later moved to Broadway. The New York Times reviewer wrote of the Spelling Bee Broadway transfer that "Mr. Lapine has sharpened all the musical's elements without betraying its appealing modesty." The latest Finn-Lapine work is Little Miss Sunshine, which premiered in 2011 at the La Jolla Playhouse in California.

Lapine has also directed dramas, including Dirty Blonde, which ran Off-Broadway and then on Broadway in 2000. Conceived by Claudia Shear and Lapine and written by Shear with direction by Lapine, Ben Brantley called Lapine's direction "stylish and compassionate". Lapine was nominated for the Tony Award and Drama Desk Award for Best Direction of a Play.

Lapine directed the 2012 Broadway revival of Annie. He wrote a stage adaption of the Moss Hart autobiography Act One, which premiered on Broadway at the Lincoln Center Vivian Beaumont Theater in April 2014.

Lapine wrote the book for and directed the new musical Flying Over Sunset. A staged singing/reading was presented at the Vineyard Arts Project (Martha's Vineyard) in August 2015. The composer is Tom Kitt and lyrics are by Michael Korie.  The musical premiered on Broadway at the Vivian Beaumont Theater on November 11, 2021 in previews with the official opening scheduled for December 13. The production was originally scheduled to open on April 16, 2020, but was postponed due to the COVID-19 pandemic.

In 1991, Lapine directed his first film, Impromptu, which has a screenplay by his wife, Sarah Kernochan. The story revolves around the romance of George Sand and Chopin, and stars Judy Davis and Hugh Grant. He followed with Life With Mikey, with Michael J. Fox for Disney. In 1993, he directed Passion, starring the original Broadway cast, for television. He directed the film version of Anne Tyler's novel Earthly Possessions, starring Susan Sarandon and Stephen Dorff, for HBO in 1999. He wrote the screenplay for Disney's film version of Into the Woods (2014), directed by Rob Marshall. He wrote and directed the film Custody in 2016 with Viola Davis, Hayden Panettiere, and Catalina Sandino Moreno.

Lapine received the 2015 Mr. Abbott Award at a special gala on October 19, 2015. The award is presented by the Stage Directors and Choreographers Foundation "in recognition of a lifetime of exceptional achievement in the theatre." Lapine's book Putting It Together: How Stephen Sondheim and I Created Sunday in the Park with George was released on August 3, 2021, and reviewed by Alan Cumming in a cover story in the New York Times Book Review on August 8, 2021.

Personal life
Lapine is married to American screenwriter and director Sarah Kernochan. The couple's daughter is food writer Phoebe Lapine. James Lapine's niece, Sarna Lapine, directed the 2016 concert version and the 2017 Broadway revival of Sunday in the Park with George.

Theater
As a director, Lapine has worked on:
Photograph by Gertrude Stein (1977)
Twelve Dreams (1978; 1981; 1995) - 1981 Public Theater
Table Settings (1979; 1980) - Playwrights Horizons
March of the Falsettos (1981) - composed by William Finn
A Midsummer Night's Dream (1982) - written by William Shakespeare
Sunday in the Park with George (1984) - composed by Stephen Sondheim
Merrily We Roll Along (1985, La Jolla Playhouse) - composed by Stephen Sondheim
Into the Woods (1987; 1997; 2002) - composed by Stephen Sondheim
The Winter's Tale (1989) - written by William Shakespeare
Falsettoland (1990) - composed by William Finn
Falsettos (1992; 2016) - composed by William Finn
Passion (1994) - composed by Stephen Sondheim
Luck, Pluck, and Virtue (1995) - La Jolla Playhouse and Atlantic Theatre Company
Golden Child (1996; 1998) - written by David Henry Hwang
The Diary of Anne Frank (1997) - written by Frances Goodrich and Albert Hackett
Der Glöckner von Notre Dame (1999, original Berlin version) - composed by Alan Menken and Stephen Schwartz
Dirty Blonde (2000) - written by Claudia Shear
Amour (2002) - composed by Michel Legrand
Fran's Bed (2003; 2005) - Long Wharf Theatre; Playwrights Horizons
Modern Orthodox (2004)
The 25th Annual Putnam County Spelling Bee (2005) - composed by William Finn
King Lear (2007) - written by William Shakespeare
Sondheim on Sondheim (2010) - musical revue of Stephen Sondheim work
Little Miss Sunshine (2011, La Jolla Playhouse; 2013) - composed by William Finn
Annie (2012) - Music by Charles Strouse, lyrics by Martin Charnin, and book by Thomas Meehan
Act One (2014) - Broadway, Lincoln Center
Mrs. Miller Does Her Thing (2016) - Signature Theatre (Virginia)
Flying Over Sunset (2021)

Writer, musicals
He has written the libretti for the following musicals:
Sunday in the Park with George - 1984
Into the Woods - 1987
Falsettoland - 1990
Falsettos - 1992
Passion - 1994
Der Glöckner von Notre Dame - 1999 (original Berlin version)
A New Brain (Off-Broadway) - 1999
Little Miss Sunshine - 2011
Flying Over Sunset - 2021

Writer, plays
Table Settings - 1979 and 1980 at Playwrights Horizons
Twelve Dreams - 1978; 1981 Public Theater
Luck, Pluck, and Virtue - 1995, La Jolla Playhouse and Atlantic Theatre Company, both starring Neil Patrick Harris
The Moment When - 2000, Playwrights Horizons, featuring Mark Ruffalo and Phyllis Newman
Fran's Bed - 2003, Long Wharf Theatre, starring Mia Farrow; 2005 Playwrights Horizons
Act One - 2014, Broadway, Lincoln Center
Mrs. Miller Does Her Thing - 2016, Signature Theatre (Virginia), featuring Debra Monk

Film

Published works
Putting It Together: How Stephen Sondheim and I Created Sunday in the Park with George (2021)

Awards and nominations

Notes

References
 Haagensen, Erik J. (1994). "The Passion of James Lapine". Showmusic: The Musical Theatre Magazine. pp. 11-16.
 Secrest, Meryle (1999). Stephen Sondheim: A Life, Random House.

External links
 
 
 
TonyAwards.com Interview with James Lapine
Official Site of James Lapine
James Lapine Papers. Yale Collection of American Literature, Beinecke Rare Book and Manuscript Library.

1949 births
20th-century American dramatists and playwrights
20th-century American male writers
21st-century American dramatists and playwrights
21st-century American male writers
American male dramatists and playwrights
American male screenwriters
American musical theatre directors
American musical theatre librettists
Broadway theatre directors
California Institute of the Arts alumni
Drama Desk Award winners
Franklin & Marshall College alumni
Living people
People from Mansfield, Ohio
Pulitzer Prize for Drama winners
Screenwriters from Connecticut
Screenwriters from New York (state)
Screenwriters from Ohio
Tony Award winners
Yale University faculty